A , sometimes spelled Butudan, is a shrine commonly found in temples and homes in Japanese Buddhist  cultures. A butsudan is either a defined, often ornate platform or simply a wooden cabinet sometimes crafted with doors that enclose and protect a Gohonzon or religious icon, typically a statue or painting of a Buddha or Bodhisattva, or a calligraphic mandala scroll.

The butsudan's primary use is for paying respects to the Buddha, as well as to family members who have died.

Arrangement
A butsudan usually contains an array of subsidiary religious accessories, called butsugu, such as candlesticks, incense burners, bells, and platforms for placing offerings such as fruit, tea or rice. Some Buddhist sects place ihai memorial tablets, kakochō death registers for deceased relatives,  or urns containing the cremated remains of relatives, either within or near the butsudan. The defined space which occupies the Butsudan is referred to as Butsuma. If there are doors used, a Butsudan enshrines the Gohonzon icon during religious observances, and close after usage. In case of no doors, either a sheet of brocade or white cloth is sometimes placed over to render its sacred space. Traditional Japanese beliefs hold the Butsudan to be a house of the Buddha, Bodhisattva, as well as of deceased relatives enshrined within it. In some Buddhist sects, when a Butsudan is replaced or repaired by the family, a re-enshrinement ceremony follows.

The arrangement and types of items in and around the butsudan can vary depending on the sect. A butsudan usually houses a honzon, a statue or painting of the Buddha or a Buddhist deity that reflects the school which the family follows, though embroidered scrolls containing a mantric or sutric text are also common. Other auxiliary items often found near the butsudan include tea, water and food (usually fruits or rice), an incense burner, candles, flowers, hanging lamps and evergreens. A rin often accompanies the butsudan, which can be rung during liturgy or recitation of prayers. Members of some Buddhist sects place ihai or tablets engraved with the names of deceased family members within or next to the butsudan. Other Buddhist sects, such as Jōdo Shinshū, usually do not have these, but may instead have pictures of the deceased placed near the butsudan.  The butsudan is typically placed upon a larger cabinet in which are kept important family documents and certificates.

Social-spiritual relations
The butsudan is commonly seen as an essential part in the life of a traditional Japanese family as it is the centre of spiritual faith within the household, especially in dealing with the deaths of family members or reflecting on the lives of ancestors. This is especially true in many rural villages, where it is common for more than 90% of households to possess a butsudan, to be contrasted with urban and suburban areas, where the rate of butsudan ownership can often fall below 60%.

See also
 Gohonzon (Nichiren Buddhism)
 Kamidana – analogous concept in Shinto
 Spirit house

Notes

References
 Buckley, Sandra (2002) "Butsudan and Kamidana" in Buckley, Sandra (Ed.) Encyclopedia of Contemporary Japanese Culture, pp. 56–57. London: Routledge. .
 Hamabata, M. Masayuki (1990). Crested Kimono: Power and Love in the Japanese Business Family. New York: Cornell University Press. .
 Lewis, Todd T. (2007). "Butsudan" in Espin, Orlando (Ed.) An Introductory Dictionary of Theology and Religious Studies, pg. 178. Collegeville: Liturgical Press. .
 Nakamaki, Hirochika (2003). Japanese Religions at Home and Abroad. New York: Routledge/Curzon. .
 Reader, Ian (1995). Japanese Religions: Past and Present. Honolulu: University of Hawaii Press. .

Further reading 
 Rambelli, Fabio (2010). Home Buddhas: Historical Processes and Modes of Representation of the Sacred in the Japanese Buddhist Family Altar, Japanese Religions 35 (1-2), 63-86
  Nelson, John K. (2008). Household Altars in Contemporary Japan: Rectifying Buddhist “Ancestor Worship” with Home Décor and Consumer Choice, Japanese Journal of Religious Studies 35 (2), 305-330

External links 
 

Japanese home
Buddhism in Japan
Buddhist ritual implements
Japanese inventions